Petr Házl (born 29 August 1971 in Litoměřice) is a Czech former handball player who competed in the 1992 Summer Olympics.

References

1971 births
Living people
Czech male handball players
Olympic handball players of Czechoslovakia
Czechoslovak male handball players
Handball players at the 1992 Summer Olympics
People from Litoměřice
Sportspeople from the Ústí nad Labem Region